Amand Theis (born 19 November 1949) is a German retired professional footballer who made a total of 296 appearances in the Bundesliga during his playing career.

Personal life
Theis was born in Hellenhahn-Schellenberg. He is the grandfather of the German footballer Luca Kilian.

References

External links 
 

1949 births
Living people
People from Westerwaldkreis
German footballers
Footballers from Rhineland-Palatinate
Association football defenders
Bundesliga players
2. Bundesliga players
1. FC Nürnberg players
Kickers Offenbach players
Borussia Dortmund players
Fortuna Düsseldorf players